Paul Xavier Kelley (November 11, 1928December 29, 2019) was a United States Marine Corps four-star general who served as the 28th Commandant of the United States Marine Corps from July 1, 1983, to June 30, 1987.

Kelley served 37 years active duty in the Marine Corps. Commissioned through Villanova College's Naval Reserve Officer Training Corps program in 1950, his first posting was with Aircraft Engineering Squadron 12 (AES-12) at Marine Corps Air Station Quantico, Virginia. He then served as an exchange officer with the Royal Marines, and later joined the Marine Force Reconnaissance community and served with distinction during the Vietnam War. Kelley's final assignments were as Assistant Commandant of the Marine Corps and then Commandant of the Marine Corps until his retirement in 1987. Following his retirement from the Marine Corps, Kelley served on a number of corporate boards.

Early life
Kelley was born on November 11, 1928, in Boston, Massachusetts, to Albert and Josephine (née Sullivan) Kelley. He was a graduate of The English High School in Boston in 1946. He earned his Bachelor of Science degree in economics from Villanova University in 1950.

Marine career
Kelley was commissioned a second lieutenant in the United States Marine Corps in June 1950 through Villanova College's Naval Reserve Officer Training Corps program. After graduating from The Basic School in March 1951, he served with the 2nd Marine Division at Camp Lejeune, North Carolina, as an infantry officer in a wide variety of billets, including his first assignment to Aircraft Engineering Squadron-12 (AES-12) out of Marine Corps Base Quantico in Virginia. While aboard Salem, he qualified as Officer of the Deck (Underway). In December 1953, he was promoted to captain.

From July 1956 to December 1957, Kelley served as the Special Assistant to the Director of Personnel at Headquarters Marine Corps, Washington, D.C. He then completed the Airborne Pathfinder School at Fort Benning, Georgia. In February 1958, he was assigned to the newly activated 2nd Force Reconnaissance Company, Force Troops, Fleet Marine Force, Atlantic, Camp Lejeune, when he served as the executive officer and then commanding officer.

From September 1960 to May 1961, Kelley was the United States Marine Corps Exchange Officer with the British Royal Marines, becoming one of the few foreigners to earn the Royal Marines Commandos' coveted green beret. During this tour, he attended the Commando Course in England, served as Assistant Operations Officer with 45 Commando in Aden, and as Commander "C" Troop, 42 Commando in Singapore, Malaya and Borneo. On March 1, 1961, he was promoted to major. From June 1964 until August 1965, Kelley became Commanding Officer, Marine Barracks, Newport, Rhode Island.

In 1965, Kelley deployed to South Vietnam. He first served as the Combat Intelligence Officer for the 3rd Marine Amphibious Force, FMF, Pacific. Following this assignment, he served as the Commanding Officer, 2nd Battalion, 4th Marines in combat. He was promoted to lieutenant colonel on January 20, 1966. During his tour as battalion commander, he earned the Silver Star, the Legion of Merit with Valor device and two awards of the Bronze Star Medal with Valor device. Four years later, from 1970 to 1971, Kelley commanded the 1st Marine Regiment, which was the last Marine regiment in combat in Vietnam. He earned a second Legion of Merit during this deployment.

In 1974, Kelley was promoted to the rank of brigadier general.  As a general officer, he served as Commanding General of the 4th Marine Division, Fleet Marine Force; Director, Marine Corps Development Center; Director, Marine Corps Education Center; and Deputy Chief of Staff for Requirements and Programs, Headquarters, United States Marine Corps. In February 1980, Kelley was promoted to lieutenant general and named as the first Commander of the Rapid Deployment Joint Task Force. On July 1, 1981, Kelley was promoted to the rank of general, the youngest Marine to have achieved that rank. He then assumed duties as the Assistant Commandant of the Marine Corps and Chief of Staff, Headquarters Marine Corps. On July 1, 1983, Kelley was named Commandant of the Marine Corps, succeeding General Robert H. Barrow.

Silver Star citation
Citation:

The President of the United States of America takes pleasure in presenting the Silver Star to Lieutenant Colonel Paul Xavier Kelley (MCSN: 0-50603), United States Marine Corps, for conspicuous gallantry and intrepidity in action while serving as Commanding Officer of the Second Battalion, Fourth Marines, THIRD Marine Division (Rein.), FMF, in connection with combat operations against insurgent communist (Viet Cong) forces in the Republic of Vietnam. On 21 March 1966, during Operation TEXAS, Lieutenant Colonel Kelley led his Battalion in a helicopter assault on a Viet Cong fortified area in Quang Ngai Province. Debarking from his helicopter into accurate, intense enemy fire, he realized that the landing zone must be enlarged in order to bring in the balance of the Battalion safely. With great professional competence and composure, he maneuvered his Companies into position to attack the enemy, employing all available supporting arms. As a result of his decisive action, all aircraft and personnel landed without sustaining casualties. In the attack phase, with complete disregard for his own safety, Lieutenant Colonel Kelley placed himself in a strategic, exposed position from which he could best control the assault companies and supporting arms. His personal example and bold leadership were a source of inspiration to all who were engaged in the operation. At the conclusion of the vicious three and a half hour battle, Lieutenant Colonel Kelley's Battalion had accounted for 167 Viet Cong killed, many small arms and crew served weapons captured, and tons of supplies destroyed. By his daring leadership, relentless fighting spirit and unswerving dedication to duty throughout, Lieutenant Colonel Kelley upheld the highest traditions of the United States Naval Service.

Promotion record
June 1950 — commissioned as Second Lieutenant
April 1952 — First Lieutenant
December 16, 1953 — Captain
March 1, 1961 — Major
January 20, 1966 — Lieutenant Colonel
April 1, 1970 — Colonel
August 6, 1974 — Brigadier General
June 29, 1976 — Major General
February 4, 1980 — Lieutenant General
July 1, 1981 — General

Post-Marine Corps career
In 1989, Kelley joined the Washington, D.C. public policy firm Cassidy & Associates; he served as the Vice Chairman Emeritus. From 1989 to 1994, he served as Chairman of the American Battle Monuments Commission. Kelley was on the board of directors of a number of corporations, including Allied Signal, Inc., GenCorp, Inc., Saul Centers, Inc., Sturm Ruger & Co., Inc.; and the Wackenhut Corporation. In December 2006, Kelley chaired a panel of military and business leaders looking to improve the United States's energy security. They recommended tougher emission standards and greater access to offshore United States gas and oil reserves.

On July 26, 2007, the Washington Post published an op-ed by Kelley and Robert F. Turner, in which they warned that the July 20, 2007 executive order issued by President George W. Bush, purporting to define torture and allowable interrogation methods, appeared to violate Common Article 3 of the Geneva Conventions and thus expose the President and other persons to potential liability for war crimes. On November 9, 2010, he was named an honorable Reagan Fellow from Eureka college.  Kelley sat on the Honorary Board for the 501 (c) (3) Non Profit Wine Country Marines.

Kelley died of complications of Alzheimer's disease at a care facility in McLean, Virginia on December 29, 2019, at the age of 91. He was interred in Arlington National Cemetery on February 13, 2020, following a memorial service at the Fort Myer Memorial Chapel.

Honors, awards and badges

Military
Kelley's decorations, awards, and badges include:

Note: The gold United States Navy Parachute Rigger badge was worn unofficially by Marine Corps personnel in place of United States Army parachutist badge from 1942 to 1963 before it officially became the Navy and Marine Corps Parachutist insignia on July 12, 1963, per BuPers Notice 1020. Members of the Marine Corps who attended jump school before 1963 were issued the silver Army parachutist badge but may be depicted wearing the gold Navy Parachute Rigger badge as it was common during this time period to do so.

Civilian
Kelley was awarded honorary doctoral degrees from Villanova University, Norwich University, Webster University, Jacksonville University, and the United States Sports Academy. He was a recipient of the National Geographic Society's Major General O.A. Anderson Award, the Veterans of Foreign Wars' National Armed Forces Award, the American Academy of Achievement's Golden Plate Award presented by Chairman of the Joint Chiefs of Staff and Awards Council member General John W. Vessey, Jr., USA, the Navy League's Admiral John M. Will Award, the Ireland Fund's Irishman of the Year for Southern California Award, the Reserve Officers Association's Minuteman Hall of Fame Award, and the Marine Corps Scholarship Fund's Semper Fidelis Award.

Eureka College, alma mater of President Ronald Reagan, named Kelley as its third "Honorary Reagan Fellow" to celebrate his lifetime of service and leadership on November 9, 2010, at the Reagan Building in Washington, D.C. The date was chosen to correspond with the 21st anniversary of the fall of the Berlin Wall.

See also

List of United States Marine Corps four-star generals

References

External links 

 
 Paul X. Kelley's obituary

1928 births
2019 deaths
United States Marine Corps personnel of the Vietnam War
Assistant Commandants of the United States Marine Corps
Burials at Arlington National Cemetery
Deaths from Alzheimer's disease
English High School of Boston alumni
Military personnel from Massachusetts
Neurological disease deaths in Virginia
People from Boston
Recipients of the Air Force Distinguished Service Medal
Recipients of the Defense Distinguished Service Medal
Recipients of the Distinguished Service Medal (US Army)
Recipients of the Distinguished Service Order (Vietnam)
Recipients of the Gallantry Cross (Vietnam)
Recipients of the Legion of Merit
Recipients of the Navy Distinguished Service Medal
Recipients of the Silver Star
United States Marine Corps Commandants
United States Marine Corps officers
Villanova University alumni